A shot glass is a glass originally designed to hold or measure spirits or liquor, which is either imbibed straight from the glass ("a shot") or poured into a cocktail ("a drink"). An alcoholic beverage served in a shot glass and typically consumed quickly, in one gulp, may also be known as a "shooter".

Shot glasses decorated with a wide variety of toasts, advertisements, humorous pictures, or other decorations and words are popular souvenirs and collectibles, especially as merchandise of a brewery.

Name origin 

The word shot, meaning a drink of alcohol, has been used since at least the 17th century, while it is known to have referred specifically to a small drink of spirits in the U.S. since at least the 1920s. The phrase shot glass has been in use since at least the 1940s.

Earliest shot glasses 

Some of the earliest whiskey glasses in America from the late 1700s to early 1800s were called "whiskey tasters" or "whiskey tumblers" and were hand blown. They are thick, similar to today's shot glasses, but will show a pontil mark or scar on the bottom, or a cupped area on the bottom where the pontil mark was ground and polished off. Some of these glasses even have hand-applied handles and decorations hand crafted using a grinding wheel.

In the early to mid-1800s, glass blowers began to use molds and several different patterns of "whiskey tasters" in several different colors were being made in molds. These glasses are also thick like today's shot glass but they will have rough pontiled bottoms from being hand blown into the mold. By the 1870s to 1890s as glass making technology improved, the rough pontiled bottoms largely disappeared from glasses and bottles.

Sizes

Types of shot glasses

Cheater glass 

These glasses are for those wary of heavy drinking, or for establishments which want to cheat their patrons into thinking they are being given more than they are in reality. Their bottoms are sturdy and thick, so they give the illusion of a plain shot glass, when in reality they only hold two-thirds as much liquid.

Single glass 
A single shot glass holds a full shot.

Fluted glass 
A fluted glass is a type of shot glass with a basic fluting featured on the base of the glass.

Pony glass 
Pony glasses can only hold about an ounce (30 ml) of fluid each but are normally used while mixing drinks into a larger glass.

Tall shot glass 
Tall shot glasses are taller, but narrower. They are sometimes also known as shooter glasses.

Rounded glass 
In rounded shot glasses, the walls of the glass curve down leaving a 10 centimetre difference between the lip of the glass and the bottom rim of the glass. They are popular in Europe.

Shot-measuring tools

Jigger 

A jigger, also known as a measure, is a bartending tool used to measure liquor, which is typically then poured into a glass or cocktail shaker.

The term jigger in the sense of a small cup or measure of spirits or wine originates in the U.S. in the early 19th century. Many references from the 1800s describe the "jigger boss" providing jiggers of whiskey to Irish immigrant workers who were digging canals in the U.S. Northeast.

The style of double-ended jigger common today, made of stainless steel with two unequal sized opposing cones in an hourglass shape, was patented in 1893 by Cornelius Dungan of Chicago. Typically, one cone measures a regulation single shot, and the other some fraction or multiple—with the actual sizes depending on local laws and customs.

A contemporary jigger measure in the U.S. usually holds , while the jiggers used in the U.K. are typically 25 ml or sometimes 35 ml. Jiggers may also hold other amounts and ratios, and can vary depending on the region and date of manufacture.  Many jiggers may also have fractional markings on the inside of the bowl, to facilitate smaller measures of liquid.

Measuring shot glass 

A shot glass graduated in smaller units such as half-ounces, teaspoons, tablespoons, or millilitres. They are useful for precise measurement of cocktail ingredients, as well as in cooking recipes that call for multiples of a smaller unit (e.g. several teaspoons), allowing the dispensing of the amount in a single measure.

See also 
 Alcoholic spirits measure
 Alcohol measurements

References

External links 

 The Shotglass collectors website

Drinking glasses
Measurement
Alcohol measurement
Collecting
Volumetric instruments
Customary units of measurement in the United States

de:Trinkglas#Schnapsglas